Singing Saw is the third studio album by American indie rock musician Kevin Morby, released on April 15, 2016 on Dead Oceans.

Critical reception

Singing Saw received widespread critical acclaim from contemporary music critics. At Metacritic, which assigns a normalized rating out of 100 to reviews from mainstream critics, the album received an average score of 84, based on 13 reviews, which indicates "universal acclaim
".

Mark Richardson of Pitchfork praised the album, stating, "Singing Saw is his strongest album because it shows a process of refinement, and because Morby’s songwriting has become less referential and more grounded. The basic ingredients haven’t changed, but Morby is figuring out how to retain and amplify his strongest points—his weary and wise voice, his understanding of how the musical pieces fit together—and leave everything else behind. On his debut, Morby’s voice cracked in places, suggesting effort that transcended ability, but Singing Saw finds him cool and controlled at every turn, fully aware of his limitations but confident in what he can accomplish within them. His singing is simultaneously intimate and distant, part conversation and part stylized monologue. Single lines don’t really stand out, but Morby’s commitment to such elemental concerns has a cumulative effect, and the album’s lack of specificity becomes a strength."

Accolades

Track listing

Personnel
Credits adapted from the liner notes of Singing Saw.

Main personnel
 Kevin Morby – guitar, vocals, piano
 Sam Cohen – guitar, bass, keyboards, drums
 Marco Benevento – piano (2, 3, 5, 8, 9), keyboards (2, 3, 5, 8, 9)
 John Andrews – singing saw (1, 3)
 Alec Spiegelman – saxophone (4, 7), flute (4, 7)
 Eliza Bagg – strings (1, 4, 7, 9)
 Oliver Hill – strings (1, 4, 7, 9)
 Cole Kamen-Green – trumpet (2, 5, 9)
 Justin Sullivan – drums (2-4), percussion (2-4)
 Nick Kinsey – drums (2, 5, 7-9), percussion (2, 5, 7-9)
 Alecia Chakour – backing vocals (2, 3, 5, 7-9)
 Hannah Cohen – backing vocals (2, 3, 5, 7-9)
 Lauren Balthrop – backing vocals (2, 3, 5, 7-9)

Additional personnel
 Sam Cohen – production, additional engineering
 Jeff Lipton – mastering
 D. James Goodwin – engineering, mixing
 John Thayer – assistant engineering
 Maria Rice – assistant mastering engineering
 Dusdin Condren – photography
 Miles Johnson – design

Charts

References

2016 albums
Kevin Morby albums
Dead Oceans albums